This is a list of airports in Eritrea, sorted by location.



List

See also 
 Transport in Eritrea
 List of airports by ICAO code: H#HH - Eritrea
 Wikipedia: WikiProject Aviation/Airline destination lists: Africa#Eritrea

References

External links 
 Lists of airports in Eritrea:
 Great Circle Mapper
 Aircraft Charter World
 World Aero Data

Eritrea
 
Airports
Airports
Eritrea